Longing Was a Safe Place to Hide is the second studio album released by Australian guitar pop, rock band, Love Outside Andromeda on 18 September 2006. It peaked at No. 8 on the ARIA Hitseekers Albums chart. Overall, it is significantly mellower than their self-titled debut, distancing itself from some of the more frantic songs.

Lead single, "Bound by Hurt Dissolved", received radio play in late 2005, and later singles, "Measuring Tape" and "Sparrow", began to receive play in July to August 2006, closer to the album's appearance. Its title is a lyric from the fourth track, "A Room Full of People". The group effectively disbanded in December 2006, with an announcement of the hiatus on their website, "we've decided it's time to take a serious break. Effective immediately."

Track listing 

Shock Records (LOA004) All tracks are written by Sianna Lee, except as noted.

"Razor Stone Free" – 2:06
"Enora" – 4:05
"Bound by Hurt Dissolved" – 3:43
"A Room Full of People" – 3:16
"Sparrow" – 2:48
"Keep Looking at the Sky" (S Lee, Joseph Hammond) – 4:17
"You and Me Amplified" – 2:45
"Measuring Tape" – 3:36
"Hook in My Throat" – 3:28
"Past Tense (But a Prayer Nonetheless)" (Jamie Slocombe, S Lee, Hammond) – 7:32
"A Pretty Girl for a Power Game" – 3:26

Personnel 

Love Outside Andromeda
 Jesse Lee – bass guitar, double bass, keyboards, guitar
 Jamie Slocombe – guitar, keyboards, backing vocals, percussion, horns arranger
 Joseph Hammond – drums, keyboards, guitars, backing vocals, percussion, horns arranger
 Sianna Lee – lead vocals, guitars, keyboards

Other musicians
 Alastair Watts – cello, double bass, extra keyboards, strings arranger
 Russell Fawcus – violin
 Raphael Hammond – trumpet
 Sebastian Hammond – saxophone
 Raph, Cedric, Ali, Jeremy Lee, Ashleigh Flanders – backing vocals (track 11)

Production work
 Producer – Tony Cohen, Russell Fawcus

References

External links 

Love Outside Andromeda | Releases

2006 albums
Love Outside Andromeda albums
Shock Records albums